The Edinburgh Fire Research Centre (formerly the BRE Centre for Fire Safety Engineering) is the research group at The Institute of Infrastructure and Environment, University of Edinburgh conducting research in fire, structures and environment.

The University of Edinburgh has a long tradition in Fire Protection Engineering research and education and is recognized internationally for its work since the early 1970s. The Centre has a state-of-the-art experimental facility (the Rushbrook Fire Safety Laboratory) and staff whose expertise covers a wide range of subjects in Fire Safety.

The Fire Research Centre is deeply involved in setting the direction for the Fire Safety Engineering practice.

History
The University of Edinburgh was the university to offer a degree in Fire Engineering, and appointed David Rasbash as the first ever Professor of Fire Safety Engineering in 1974. Many of those who are now leaders in the field came to Edinburgh to study and research under the supervision of Rasbash, one of the main pioneers of the discipline, and Dougal Drysdale, author of the definitive text book on the subject. Jose Torero held the BRE/RAE Chair in Fire Safety Engineering from 2004 to 2012. Albert Simeoni held the BRE chair from 2013 to 2015. Grunde Jomaas held the BRE chair from 2016 to 2021. Teaching and research in fire safety continues at Edinburgh under the leadership of Prof Luke Bisby, professor of fire and structures.

Staff
The staff of the Edinburgh Fire Research Centre comprises six academics, several research associates, about 20-25 postgraduate researchers and some undergraduate researchers.

Teaching
The Centre supports the Structural and Fire Safety Engineering degrees (BEng, MEng and MSc) as well as a number of short courses for professionals.

The centre is part of the International Master of Science in Fire Safety Engineering consortium. The joint degree started in September 2010 and involves the universities of Edinburgh (UK), Ghent (Belgium) and Lund (Sweden).

Research Expertise
 Structural Fire Engineering
 Fire Modelling
 Ignition and burning of solid fuels
 Large-scale fire experiments
 Concrete, Steel and wood response to fire
 Tunnel fires
 Subsurface fires
 Wildfires
 Smouldering combustion

Large-scale fire test
The Cardington tests were a series of large-scale fire tests conducted in over several years from the early 1990s in a real steel-framed structure at the former airship hangar at Cardington, UK.

The Dalmarnock tests were a series of fire experiments conducted in July 2006 in a real 1960s concrete tower block in Dalmarnock, Glasgow, UK.

Publications
The Centre publishes more than 100 conference papers and a dozen peer-reviewed journal papers per year. Some can be publicly accessed via their Digital Repository.

References

External links
 The Edinburgh Fire Research Centre official website
 Several publications from The Edinburgh Fire Research Centre
 'Skyscraper Fire Fighters' BBC Horizon TV show (aired on Tuesday 24th, 9pm in BBC Two).

Fire and rescue in Scotland
Fire protection organizations
Research institutes in Edinburgh
University of Edinburgh